is a Japanese actress and model.

Life and career
Shinkawa made her screen debut in the television drama Chōnan no Kekkon in 2008, and made her film debut in the 2010 film Matataki in which Keiko Kitagawa played the lead role. In 2010, she won the Miss Magazine 2010. Next year, 
she won the Miss Seventeen 2011. She was one of four winners chosen from 7,157 applicants. Then she started model activities as an exclusive model in the Seventeen magazine. On October 30, 2013, she debut as a singer with her first single de-light. This song was used as the ending theme in the tokusatsu drama Shōgeki Gōraigan!! aired on TV Tokyo, and it reached 45th in Oricon chart.

In May 2015, it was announced that she would graduate from Seventeen, then subsequently contracted with the Non-no magazine. She appeared on the cover of the August 2015 issue of Non-no. From October 2015, she will play the heroine in the NTV's midnight drama Seishun Tantei Haruya. On 9 August 2019 her management agency announced that she will marry an ordinary person in the near future.

Filmography

Films
 Piecing Me Back Together (2010), Makiko Kirino (high-school student)
 Ike! Danshi Kōkō Engekibu (2011), Mai Katsuragi
 Kyō, Koi o Hajimemasu (2012), Sakura Hibino
 Blue Spring Ride (2014), Shūko Murao
 Unrequited Love (2016), Mana
 Megamisama (2017)
 My Teacher, My Love (2018), Shūka Saimon
 What Happened to Our Nest Egg!? (2021), Mayumi Gotō
 The Way of the Househusband (2022), Kasumi

Television dramas
 Chōnan no Kekkon: Hanayome wa Batsuichi! Toshiue! Komochi!? (TV Asahi, 2008), Aki Ōyama
 Atsuizo! Nekogaya!! (Mētele, 2010)
 Hitori Janai (BS Fuji, 2011), Nami Tachibana
 Asu no Hikari o Tsukame (Tōkai TV, 2011), Moeko Sasaki
 Ore no Sora Keiji-hen Episode 5 (TV Asahi, 2011), Arisa Ijūin
 Tokumei Sentai Go-Busters  Reika Saotome  (Mission  41 thief pink buster)
 Toshi Densetsu no Onna Episode 4 (TV Asahi, 2012), Risa Toyama
 Ataru Episode 6 (TBS, 2012)
 Papadoru Episode 5-6 (TBS, 2012), Chiemi
 GTO (KTV, 2012), Anko Uehara
 35-sai no Koukousei (NTV, 2013), Mitsuki Kudō
 Honto ni Atta Kowai Hanashi Natsu no Tokubetsu-hen 2013 (Fuji TV, 2013), Arisa Takeuchi
 Shōgeki Gōraigan!! (TV Tokyo, 2013), Hitomi Kai
 Jinsei Gokko (Fuji TV, 2013), Mako
 Yoru no Sensei (TBS, 2014), Kaede Tachibana
 Keiji (TV Tokyo, 2014), Miyako Akiba
 Water Polo Yankees (Fuji TV, 2014), Rei Fujisaki
 Shinano no Colombo Jiken File 2 (TBS, 2014), Yūko Noya
 Ōedo Sōsamō 2015: Onmitsu Dōshin, Aku o Kiru! (TV Tokyo, 2015), Okitsu
 Zeni no Sensō (KTV, 2015), Akane Madoka
 Kekkon ni Ichiban Chikakute Tōi Onna (NTV, 2015), Yuri Sudō
 Risk no Kamisama (Fuji TV, 2015), Chinami Hōjō
 Koinaka (Fuji TV, 2015), Kazuha Sawada
 Seishun Tantei Haruya (NTV, 2015), Miwa Nōmi
 Gu.ra.me! (TV Asahi, 2016), Yūko Tachibana
 IQ246 (TBS, 2016), Hitomi Hōmonji 
 School Counselor (Fuji TV-KTV, 2017), Nao Oomiya
 Sick's Spec Saga (Paravi, 2018)
 Itsumademo Shiroi Hane (Fuji TV-Tokai TV, 2018), Rumi Kizaki
 Villain: Perpetrator Chase Investigation (Wowow, 2019), Haruka
 Guilty (2020), Sayaka Ogino
 Detective Yuri Rintaro (2020), Ruriko Kusaka
 The Grand Family (Wowow, 2021)
 Come Come Everybody (2022), Sayoko Fujii

Bibliography

Magazines
 Seventeen, Shueisha 1967-, as an exclusive model from 2011 to 2015
 Non-no, Shueisha 1971-, as an exclusive model from since 2015

Discography

Singles 
 de-light (Avex Marketing, 30 October 2013) EAN 4988064487837

Awards
 Miss Magazine 2010: Won
 Miss Seventeen 2011: Won

References

External links
 Yua Shinkawa at Gekidan Tohai 
Non-no Model's Profile 
Yua Shinkawa Official blog 

1993 births
Japanese film actresses
Japanese female models
Japanese gravure idols
Japanese television actresses
Japanese television personalities
Living people
Actors from Saitama Prefecture
Models from Saitama Prefecture
21st-century Japanese actresses